Dulle Farmstead Historic District, also known as Pleasant Home Farm, is a historic home and farm and national historic district located near Jefferson City, Cole County, Missouri.  It encompasses nine contributing buildings and one contributing structure and include the brick I-house form farmhouse (1902), the multi-purpose barn (c. 1858), the cattle barn (1933), the ice house (c. 1925), the garage (1942), two chicken shelters (c. 1942), two brooder houses (c. 1942), and an oak plank and iron beam bridge (1934).

It was listed on the National Register of Historic Places in 1993.

References

Historic districts on the National Register of Historic Places in Missouri
Farms on the National Register of Historic Places in Missouri
Buildings and structures in Cole County, Missouri
National Register of Historic Places in Cole County, Missouri